The Albanian Naval Force is the naval branch of the Albanian military. Their name was changed from the Albanian Naval Defense Forces in 2010. The Naval Force is headquartered in Durrës, and operates multiple bases, including Kepi i Palit base in Durrës, and Pashaliman in Vlorë.

The vessels of the Albanian Naval Force are mostly patrol craft and support craft. The Naval Force operates four large Damen Stan Type 4207 patrol boats, three of which were built in Albania. Some of the Naval Force's vessels were purchased from, or donated by Italy, the United States, China, or the Soviet Union. Most former Soviet or Chinese boats have been retired from service; only one Soviet-built minesweeper remains in service.

The Naval Force performs mainly duties, based on the concept of "one Force, two Missions." The legal framework has been updated in order to facilitate these missions and EU-NATO integration. The Naval Force is also responsible for aids to navigation, including lighthouses.

History

Early history
The history of the Albanian navy dates back to the General Command of Military Powers in 1925, following the creation of the Albanian Republic. Earlier efforts to create an Albanian naval force following Albanian independence in 1912 failed due to the start of World War I. In this period Albania possessed few naval vessels. Following the establishment of the  Albanian Kingdom by King Zog in 1928, the navy was reformed into the Royal Albanian Navy.

Following the Italian invasion of Albania and World War II, the Albanian Armed Forces were abolished and many ships were destroyed in the harbors of Albania.

During the Socialist Era

The early history of the People's Socialist Republic of Albania saw Albania recovering from the result of Italian occupation and World War II. In 1945, a shipyard was built in Durrës to repair Albania's remaining ships.

In the mid-1950s Albania began to modernize and expand its navy. In 1954, a torpedo boat unit and the associated facility was established on Sazan Island, off the coast of Durrës. A submarine unit was established in 1958. A naval academy was opened in Vlorë in 1961.

Until 1996 Albania had more than 145 vessels in service. 45 of them were small, fast Chinese Type 25 Huchuan-class PHT torpedo boats, carrying two/four  torpedoes, and some Shanghai-class coastal anti-submarine (ASW) patrol craft. The largest of the fleet were four Soviet-built s, a direct result of an Albanian-Soviet dispute over their ownership, after Albania withdrew from the Warsaw Pact (1961) and the Soviets abandoned the Pasha Liman Base. The submarines were put into full service thanks to Chinese assistance, but by the end of the 1980s their efficiency was in doubt due to Albanian isolation and the end of Chinese help.

Recent history
The collapse of the People's Socialist Republic of Albania began in the early 1990s and was finalized with the 1992 elections and the founding of the 4th Albanian Republic. The fall of communism in Albania ushered in a new era of cooperation between the navies of Albania and other European nations. Starting in the 1990s, Albania began to take part in numerous search and rescue exercises alongside other European nations.

Vessels of the Albanian navy were seriously damaged during the 1997 political conflict. In March 1998, the Albanian Navy docked in Italy for repair and refuge. The Naval Force's facilities were also damaged in the conflict and repairs were made with the help of the United States, Italy, Germany, Greece, Turkey, and other countries. In the same year, Albania retired its four Whiskey-class submarines.

As a result of numerous agreements made between 1998 and 2004, Albania received donated patrol vessels from the United States and Italy for use in search and rescue operations. The United States donated five boats in 1998, Italy donated six boats in 2002, and Italy donated another five in 2004. In 2004, Albania entered into an agreement with Italy wherein the Italian Navy provided equipment and technical assistance to the Albanian Naval Force in order to upgrade the country's aids to navigation.

In June 2007, Albania renamed and reorganised its navy. The newly named Naval Force was thereafter organised into two flotillas and a logistics battalion.

Facilities

The Naval Force operates multiple bases, including Kepi i Palit base in Durrës, and Pashaliman in Vlorë. In the past, the Naval Force operated additional facilities including Porto Palermo, outside of Himarë, a submarine base on Sazan Island, and a base in Shëngjin.

Pashaliman
Pashaliman Naval Base, located near Vlorë, has been used by the Albanian Navy from the 1950s. In that time it was one of few naval bases in the Mediterranean. Currently, four retired Whiskey-class submarines previously owned by the Soviet Union are still located on the facility alongside Albania's active-duty naval vessels. Three of the Albanian Navy's four Damen Stan patrol vessels were built at Pashaliman, the most recent completed in 2014. 

The Naval Force often operates naval exercises in the Bay of Vlorë, out of Pashaliman. The most recent exercise was in April 2016.

A civilian naval engineering firm and shipyard also operate out of the military facility at Pashaliman.

Porto Palermo 
The Albanian Navy previously operated a submarine bunker called Porto Palermo, which was shut down after the decommissioning of Albania's submarines. In recent years, Porto Palermo has been used as the site of training exercises with foreign militaries, most recently a joint exercise with the United Kingdom.

Structure 

  Naval Force, in Durrës
 Staff Support Company, in Durrës
 Maritime Fleet, at Pasha Liman Base in Vlorë
 4x Stan 4207 patrol vessels: P 131 Iliria and P 133 Lisus in Durrës, P 132 Oriku and P 134 Butrinti in Vlorë
 numerous smaller units
 Maritime Surveillance Centre, in Durrës
 Diving Centre, at Pasha Liman Base, Vlorë
 Naval Basic Training Centre, in Durrës
 Hydrographic Service, in Durrës

Officer ranks

Other ranks

Equipment

See also
 List of navies
 Albanian Armed Forces
 Albanian Army
 Albanian Air Force
 Albanian Hydrographic Service

References

Sources
Wertheim, Eric. The Naval Institute Guide to Combat Fleets of the World, 2005–2006; Their Ships, Aircraft, and Systems. US Naval Institute Press. Annapolis, Maryland. 2005.
Jane's Fighting Ships 2005–2006, Jane's Information Group, 
The Military Balance 2008, The International Institute for Strategic Studies,

External links
Equipment

Military units and formations of Albania
Navies by country